The women's 400 metres was the second-longest of the four women's track races in the Athletics at the 1964 Summer Olympics program in Tokyo.  It was held on 15 October, 16 October, and 17 October 1964.  23 athletes from 17 nations entered.  The first round was held on 15 October, the semifinals on 16 October, and the final on 17 October. The 1964 Summer Olympics were the first to feature the women's 400 metres.

Results

First round

The top five runners in each of the 3 heats advanced, as well as the next fastest runner from across the heats.

Heat 1

Heat 2

Heat 3

Semifinals

The fastest four runners in each of the two semifinals advanced to the final.

Semifinal 1

Semifinal 2

Final

References

Athletics at the 1964 Summer Olympics
400 metres at the Olympics
1964 in women's athletics
Women's events at the 1964 Summer Olympics